Heamani Lavaka (born 10 January 1969) is a Tongan former rugby union player who played as prop.

Career
Lavaka was first capped for Tonga during the match against Samoa in Apia, on 13 July 1996. He was also part of the 2003 Rugby World Cup roster coached by Jim Love, playing four matches in the tournament, with the match against Canada in Wollongong on 29 October 2003 being his last international test cap. At club level, Lavaka played the Australian Rugby Championship for Melbourne Rebels in the 2007–08 season.

References

External links
Heamani Lavaka international statistics at ESPN Scrum
Heamani Lavaka at itsrugby.fr

l

1969 births
Living people
Tonga international rugby union players
Tongan rugby union players
Expatriate rugby union players in Australia
Rugby union props